Rest is the fifth album by French singer and actress Charlotte Gainsbourg. It was primarily produced by French electronic musician SebastiAn, and released on 17 November 2017 by Because Music. It is her first album release in six years, and features collaborations with Paul McCartney, Guy-Manuel de Homem-Christo, Owen Pallett and Connan Hosford, among others. The tracks "Rest" and "Deadly Valentine" were released as singles and music videos, both directed by Gainsbourg herself.

The album explores the deaths of Gainsbourg's father Serge Gainsbourg and half-sister Kate Barry, with a focus on the theme of alcohol addiction. She has commented that "the album took a different direction. I wanted to express [my grief] not only with sadness but with anger." The lyrics are in English and French.

Background
When they first met, SebastiAn told Gainsbourg that he would like to work with her but that he wanted the project to be done in French, but she refused to do so. A year later, Gainsbourg, after the death of her sister Kate Barry, contacted him again and told him that she would like to say certain things and that she could only say them in French. Thus, they started working on Rest in New York.

Critical reception

Rest received acclaim from music critics. At Metacritic, which assigns a normalized rating out of 100 to reviews from mainstream critics, the album has an average score of 80 out of 100, which indicates "generally favorable reviews" based on 22 reviews. Olivia Horn of Pitchfork awarded the album a "Best New Music" designation, claiming "it is at once scorchingly intimate and fantastically oversized". Exclaim!s Anna Alger praised Gainsbourg for striking "a balance between sombre beauty and a mix of Euro disco, funk and pop."

Accolades

Track listing
All lyrics written by Charlotte Gainsbourg; all music composed and produced by SebastiAn; except where noted.

Personnel

Musicians
 Charlotte Gainsbourg – vocals
 SebastiAn – synthesiser , drum programming , piano , harpsichord , bells , organ , synth bass , Rhodes , bass guitar , Wurlitzer , backing vocals , guitars , clavinet 
 Emile Sornin – guitars , Mellotron , bass guitar , clavinet , harpsichord , Philicorda , Wurlitzer , glockenspiel , noise , percussion , tambourine 
 Alice Attal – backing vocals 
 Skyler Pierce Scher – backing vocals 
 Rachel Kay McCain – backing vocals 
 Elisabeth Sophia Seiple – backing vocals 
 Vincent Taeger – drums 
 Paul McCartney – guitars , piano , additional drums 

Strings and horns
 SebastiAn – arrangement
 Owen Pallett – arrangement, conducting
 Nadia Sirota – fixing, viola
 Kabir Hermon – recording
 Anna Elashvili – violin
 Annaliesa Place – violin
 Laura Lutzke – violin
 Patricia Kilroy – violin
 Pauline Kim Harris – violin 
 Rob Moose – violin
 Gabriel Cabezas – cello
 David Nelson – trombone
 Rachel Drehmann – French horn

Technical
 Tom Elmhirst – mixing 
 Joe Visciano – mixing assistance , engineering
 Brandon Boost – mixing assistance , engineering
 Eric Chedeville – mixing , engineering 
 Sebastian – engineering
 Emile Sornin – engineering
 Julien Naudin – engineering
 Antoine Poyeton – engineering
 Drew Brown – engineering
 Phil Joly – engineering
 Beatriz Artola – engineering
 Joakim Bouaziz – engineering
 Gus – engineering
 Florian Lagatta – engineering 
 Laury Chanty – engineering assistance 
 Chab – mastering

Artwork
 Collier Schorr – photos
 Nathalie Canguilhem – creative direction
 Raphaël Garnier – graphic design

Charts

Weekly charts

Year-end charts

Certifications

Notes

References

2017 albums
Charlotte Gainsbourg albums
Because Music albums
Albums produced by Guy-Manuel de Homem-Christo
Albums produced by Sebastian (French musician)